This is a comprehensive listing of the bird species recorded in Grand Teton National Park, which is in the U.S. state of Wyoming. This list is based on one published by the National Park Service (NPS).

This list is presented in the taxonomic sequence of the Check-list of North and Middle American Birds, 7th edition through the 63rd Supplement, published by the American Ornithological Society (AOS). Common and scientific names are also those of the Check-list, except that the common names of families are from the Clements taxonomy because the AOS list does not include them.

This list contains 263 species. Unless otherwise noted, all are considered to occur regularly in Grand Teton National Park as permanent residents, summer or winter visitors, or migrants. The tags below are used to designate the abundance of some species.

(R) Rare - "usually seen only a few times each year" per the NPS (11 species)
(U) Uncommon - "likely to be seen monthly in appropriate habitat and season and may be locally common" per the NPS (58 species)
(O) Occasional - "occur in a park at least once every few years, varying in numbers, but not necessarily every year" per the NPS (two species)
(NC) Unconfirmed - "Attributed to the park based on weak ("unconfirmed record") or no evidence" per the NPS (82 species)
(I) Introduced - a species introduced to North America by humans (four species)

Ducks, geese, and waterfowl
Order: AnseriformesFamily: Anatidae

The family Anatidae includes the ducks and most duck-like waterfowl, such as geese and swans. These birds are adapted to an aquatic existence with webbed feet, bills which are flattened to a greater or lesser extent, and feathers that are excellent at shedding water due to special oils.

Snow goose, Anser caerulescens (R)
Brant, Branta bernicla (NC)
Canada goose, Branta canadensis
Trumpeter swan, Cygnus buccinator
Wood duck, Aix sponsa (NC)
Blue-winged teal, Spatula discors (U)
Cinnamon teal, Spatula cyanoptera
Northern shoveler, Spatula clypeata
Gadwall, Mareca strepera
American wigeon, Mareca americana
Mallard, Anas platyrhynchos
Northern pintail, Anas acuta (U)
Green-winged teal, Anas crecca
Canvasback, Aythya valisineria (U)
Redhead, Aythya americana (U)
Ring-necked duck, Aythya collaris
Greater scaup, Aythya marila (NC)
Lesser scaup, Aythya affinis (U)
Harlequin duck, Histrionicus histrionicus (U)
Bufflehead, Bucephala albeola
Common goldeneye, Bucephala clangula
Barrow's goldeneye, Bucephala islandica
Hooded merganser, Lophodytes cucullatus (U)
Common merganser, Mergus merganser
Red-breasted merganser, Mergus serrator (U)
Ruddy duck, Oxyura jamaicensis (U)

Pheasants, grouse, and allies
Order: GalliformesFamily: Phasianidae

Phasianidae consists of the pheasants and their allies. These are terrestrial species, variable in size but generally plump with broad relatively short wings. Many species are gamebirds or have been domesticated as a food source for humans.

Ruffed grouse, Bonasa umbellus
Greater sage-grouse, Centrocercus urophasianus (U)
Dusky grouse, Dendragapus obscurus
Gray partridge, Perdix perdix (I) (NC)
Ring-necked pheasant, Phasianus colchicus (I) (NC)

Grebes
Order: PodicipediformesFamily: Podicipedidae

Grebes are small to medium-large freshwater diving birds. They have lobed toes and are excellent swimmers and divers. However, they have their feet placed far back on the body, making them quite ungainly on land.

Pied-billed grebe, Podilymbus podiceps (U)
Horned grebe, Podiceps auritus (NC)
Eared grebe, Podiceps nigricollis
Western grebe, Aechmorphorus occidentalis (U)
Clark's grebe, Aechmorphorus clarkii (U)

Pigeons and doves
Order: ColumbiformesFamily: Columbidae

Pigeons and doves are stout-bodied birds with short necks and short slender bills with a fleshy cere.

Rock pigeon, Columba livia (I) (O)
Band-tailed pigeon, Patagioenas fasciata (NC)
Mourning dove, Zenaida macroura

Cuckoos
Order: CuculiformesFamily: Cuculidae

The family Cuculidae includes cuckoos, roadrunners, and anis. These birds are of variable size with slender bodies, long tails, and strong legs.

Yellow-billed cuckoo, Coccyzus americanus (NC)

Nightjars and allies
Order: CaprimulgiformesFamily: Caprimulgidae

Nightjars are medium-sized nocturnal birds that usually nest on the ground. They have long wings, short legs, and very short bills. Most have small feet, of little use for walking, and long pointed wings. Their soft plumage is cryptically colored to resemble bark or leaves.

Common nighthawk,  Chordeiles minor
Common poorwill,  Phalaenoptilus nuttallii (NC)

Swifts
Order: ApodiformesFamily: Apodidae

The swifts are small birds which spend the majority of their lives flying. These birds have very short legs and never settle voluntarily on the ground, perching instead only on vertical surfaces. Many swifts have very long, swept-back wings which resemble a crescent or boomerang.

White-throated swift, Aeronautes saxatalis (NC)

Hummingbirds
Order: ApodiformesFamily: Trochilidae

Hummingbirds are small birds capable of hovering in mid-air due to the rapid flapping of their wings. They are the only birds that can fly backwards.

Calliope hummingbird, Selasphorus calliope
Rufous hummingbird, Selasphorus rufus
Broad-tailed hummingbird, Selasphorus platycercus

Rails, gallinules, and coots
Order: GruiformesFamily: Rallidae

Rallidae is a large family of small to medium-sized birds which includes the rails, crakes, coots, and gallinules. The most typical family members occupy dense vegetation in damp environments near lakes, swamps, or rivers. In general they are shy and secretive birds, making them difficult to observe. Most species have strong legs and long toes which are well adapted to soft uneven surfaces. They tend to have short, rounded wings and tend to be weak fliers.

Yellow rail, Coturnicops noveboracensis (R)
Virginia rail, Rallus limicola (U)
Sora, Porzana carolina
American coot, Fulica americana

Cranes
Order: GruiformesFamily: Gruidae

Cranes are large, long-legged, and long-necked birds. Unlike the similar-looking but unrelated herons, cranes fly with necks outstretched, not pulled back. Most have elaborate and noisy courting displays or "dances".

Sandhill crane, Antigone canadensis

Stilts and avocets
Order: CharadriiformesFamily: Recurvirostridae

Recurvirostridae is a family of large wading birds which includes the avocets and stilts. The avocets have long legs and long up-curved bills. The stilts have extremely long legs and long, thin, straight bills.

Black-necked stilt, Himantopus mexicanus (NC)
American avocet, Recurvirostra americana (R)

Plovers and lapwings
Order: CharadriiformesFamily: Charadriidae

The family Charadriidae includes the plovers, dotterels, and lapwings. They are small to medium-sized birds with compact bodies, short thick necks, and long, usually pointed, wings. They are found in open country worldwide, mostly in habitats near water.

Black-bellied plover, Pluvialis squatarola (NC)
Killdeer, Charadrius vociferus
Semipalmated plover, Charadrius semipalmatus (NC)

Sandpipers and allies
Order: CharadriiformesFamily: Scolopacidae

Scolopacidae is a large diverse family of small to medium-sized shorebirds including the sandpipers, curlews, godwits, shanks, tattlers, woodcocks, snipes, dowitchers, and phalaropes. The majority of these species eat small invertebrates picked out of the mud or soil. Different lengths of legs and bills enable multiple species to feed in the same habitat, particularly on the coast, without direct competition for food.
 

Long-billed curlew, Numenius americanus (U)
Marbled godwit, Limosa fedoa (NC)
Stilt sandpiper, Calidris himantopus (NC)
Sanderling, Calidris alba (NC)
Dunlin, Calidris alpina (NC)
Baird's sandpiper, Calidris bairdii (NC)
Least sandpiper, Calidris minutilla (NC)
Pectoral sandpiper, Calidris melanotos (NC)
Semipalmated sandpiper, Calidris pusilla (NC)
Long-billed dowitcher, Limnodromus scolopaceus (U)
Wilson's snipe, Gallinago delicata
Spotted sandpiper, Actitis macularius (U)
Solitary sandpiper, Tringa solitaria (U)
Lesser yellowlegs, Tringa flavipes (NC)
Willet, Tringa semipalmata (U)
Greater yellowlegs, Tringa melanoleuca (NC)
Wilson's phalarope, Phalaropus tricolor
Red-necked phalarope, Phalaropus lobatus (NC)

Skuas and jaegers
Order: CharadriiformesFamily: Stercorariidae

Skuas and jaegers are in general medium to large birds, typically with gray or brown plumage, often with white markings on the wings. They have longish bills with hooked tips and webbed feet with sharp claws. They look like large dark gulls, but have a fleshy cere above the upper mandible. They are strong, acrobatic fliers.

Parasitic jaeger, Stercorarius parasiticus (NC)

Gulls, terns, and skimmers
Order: CharadriiformesFamily: Laridae

Laridae is a family of medium to large seabirds and includes gulls, terns, kittiwakes, and skimmers. They are typically gray or white, often with black markings on the head or wings. They have stout, longish bills and webbed feet.

Bonaparte's gull, Chroicocephalus philadelphia (NC)
Franklin's gull, Leucophaeus pipixcan
Ring-billed gull, Larus delawarensis (U)
California gull, Larus californicus
Least tern, Sternula antillarum (NC)
Caspian tern, Hydroprogne caspia (U)
Black tern, Chlidonias niger (NC)
Common tern, Sterna hirundo (U)
Forster's tern, Sterna forsteri (NC)

Loons
Order: GaviiformesFamily: Gaviidae

Loons are aquatic birds the size of a large duck, to which they are unrelated. Their plumage is largely gray or black, and they have spear-shaped bills. Loons swim well and fly adequately, but are almost hopeless on land, because their legs are placed towards the rear of the body.

Common loon, Gavia immer (U)

Cormorants and shags
Order: SuliformesFamily: Phalacrocoracidae

Cormorants are medium-to-large aquatic birds, usually with mainly dark plumage and areas of colored skin on the face. The bill is long, thin, and sharply hooked. Their feet are four-toed and webbed.

Double-crested cormorant, Nannopterum auritum

Pelicans
Order: PelecaniformesFamily: Pelecanidae

Pelicans are very large water birds with a distinctive pouch under their beak. Like other birds in the order Pelecaniformes, they have four webbed toes.

American white pelican, Pelecanus erythrorhynchos
Brown pelican, Pelecanus occidentalis (NC)

Herons, egrets, and bitterns
Order: PelecaniformesFamily: Ardeidae

The family Ardeidae contains the herons, egrets, and bitterns. Herons and egrets are medium to large wading birds with long necks and legs. Bitterns tend to be shorter necked and more secretive. Members of Ardeidae fly with their necks retracted, unlike other long-necked birds such as storks, ibises, and spoonbills.

American bittern, Botaurus lentiginosus (U)
Great blue heron, Ardea herodias
Great egret, Ardea alba (NC)
Snowy egret, Egretta thula (U)
Little blue heron, Egretta caerulea (NC)
Cattle egret, Bubulcus ibis (NC)
Black-crowned night-heron Nycticorax nycticorax

Ibises and spoonbills
Order: PelecaniformesFamily: Threskiornithidae

The family Threskiornithidae includes the ibises and spoonbills. They have long, broad wings. Their bodies tend to be elongated, the neck more so, with rather long legs. The bill is also long, decurved in the case of the ibises, straight and distinctively flattened in the spoonbills.

White-faced ibis, Plegadis chihi (U)

New World vultures
Order: CathartiformesFamily: Cathartidae

The New World vultures are not closely related to Old World vultures, but superficially resemble them because of convergent evolution. Like the Old World vultures, they are scavengers, however, unlike Old World vultures, which find carcasses by sight, New World vultures have a good sense of smell with which they locate carcasses.

Turkey vulture, Cathartes aura

Osprey
Order: AccipitriformesFamily: Pandionidae

Pandionidae is a family of fish-eating birds of prey possessing a very large, powerful hooked beak for tearing flesh from their prey, strong legs, powerful talons, and keen eyesight. The family is monotypic.

Osprey, Pandion haliaetus

Hawks, eagles, and kites
Order: AccipitriformesFamily: Accipitridae

Accipitridae is a family of birds of prey which includes hawks, eagles, kites, harriers, and Old World vultures. These birds have very large powerful hooked beaks for tearing flesh from their prey, strong legs, powerful talons, and keen eyesight.

Golden eagle, Aquila chrysaetos
Northern harrier, Circus hudsonius
Sharp-shinned hawk, Accipiter striatus (U)
Cooper's hawk, Accipiter cooperii (U)
Northern goshawk, Accipiter gentilis (U)
Bald eagle, Haliaeetus leucocephalus
Broad-winged hawk, Buteo platypterus (NC)
Swainson's hawk, Buteo swainsoni
Red-tailed hawk, Buteo jamaicensis
Rough-legged hawk, Buteo lagopus (U)
Ferruginous hawk, Buteo regalis (R)

Barn-owls
Order: StrigiformesFamily: Tytonidae

Barn-owls are medium to large owls with large heads and characteristic heart-shaped faces. They have long strong legs with powerful talons.

Barn owl, Tyto alba (R)

Owls
Order: StrigiformesFamily: Strigidae

Typical owls are small to large solitary nocturnal birds of prey. They have large forward-facing eyes and ears, a hawk-like beak, and a conspicuous circle of feathers around each eye called a facial disk.

Western screech-owl, Megascops kennicottii (NC)
Great horned owl, Bubo virginianus
Snowy owl, Bubo scandiacus (NC)
Northern pygmy-owl, Glaucidium gnoma (U)
Burrowing owl, Athene cunicularia (R)
Barred owl, Strix varia (NC)
Great gray owl, Strix nebulosa (U)
Long-eared owl, Asio otus (U)
Short-eared owl, Asio flammeus (U)
Boreal owl, Aegolius funereus (U)
Northern saw-whet owl, Aegolius acadicus (U)

Kingfishers
Order: CoraciiformesFamily: Alcedinidae

Kingfishers are medium-sized birds with large heads, long pointed bills, short legs, and stubby tails.

Belted kingfisher, Megaceryle alcyon

Woodpeckers
Order: PiciformesFamily: Picidae

Woodpeckers are small to medium-sized birds with chisel-like beaks, short legs, stiff tails, and long tongues used for capturing insects. Some species have feet with two toes pointing forward and two backward, while several species have only three toes. Many woodpeckers have the habit of tapping noisily on tree trunks with their beaks.

Lewis's woodpecker, Melanerpes lewis (NC)
Red-headed woodpecker, Melanerpes erythrocephalus (NC)
Williamson's sapsucker, Sphyrapicus thyroideus (U)
Yellow-bellied sapsucker, Sphyrapicus varius (NC)
Red-naped sapsucker, Sphyrapicus nuchalis
American three-toed woodpecker, Picoides dorsalis (U)
Black-backed woodpecker, Picoides arcticus (R)
Downy woodpecker, Dryobates pubescens
Hairy woodpecker, Dryobates villosus
White-headed woodpecker, Dryobates albolarvatus (NC)
Northern flicker, Colaptes auratus
Pileated woodpecker, Dryocopus pileatus (NC)

Falcons and caracaras
Order: FalconiformesFamily: Falconidae

Falconidae is a family of diurnal birds of prey, notably the falcons and caracaras. They differ from hawks, eagles, and kites in that they kill with their beaks instead of their talons.

American kestrel, Falco sparverius
Merlin, Falco columbarius (NC)
Gyrfalcon, Falco rusticolus (NC)
Peregrine falcon, Falco peregrinus (U)
Prairie falcon, Falco mexicanus (U)

Tyrant flycatchers
Order: PasseriformesFamily: Tyrannidae

Tyrant flycatchers are Passerine birds which occur throughout North and South America. They superficially resemble the Old World flycatchers, but are more robust and have stronger bills. They do not have the sophisticated vocal capabilities of the songbirds. Most, but not all, are rather plain. As the name implies, most are insectivorous.

Western kingbird, Tyrannus verticalis (NC)
Eastern kingbird, Tyrannus tyrannus  (U)
Olive-sided flycatcher, Contopus cooperi
Western wood-pewee, Contopus sordidulus
Willow flycatcher, Empidonax traillii
Least flycatcher, Empidonax minimus (NC)
Hammond's flycatcher, Empidonax hammondii (U)
Dusky flycatcher, Empidonax oberholseri
Cordilleran flycatcher, Empidonax occidentalis (U)
Say's phoebe, Sayornis saya (NC)

Vireos, shrike-babblers, and erpornis
Order: PasseriformesFamily: Vireonidae

The vireos are a group of small to medium-sized passerine birds restricted to the New World. They are typically greenish in color and resemble wood warblers apart from their heavier bills.

Plumbeous vireo, Vireo plumbeous (U)
Warbling vireo, Vireo gilvus
Red-eyed vireo, Vireo olivaceus (NC)

Shrikes
Order: PasseriformesFamily: Laniidae

Shrikes are passerine birds known for their habit of catching other birds and small animals and impaling the uneaten portions of their bodies on thorns.  A shrike's beak is hooked, like that of a typical bird of prey.

Loggerhead shrike, Lanius ludovicianus (U)
Northern shrike, Lanius borealis (U)

Crows, jays, and magpies
Order: PasseriformesFamily: Corvidae

The family Corvidae includes crows, ravens, jays, choughs, magpies, treepies, nutcrackers, and ground jays. Corvids are above average in size among the Passeriformes, and some of the larger species show high levels of intelligence.

Canada jay, Perisoreus canadensis
Steller's jay, Cyanocitta stelleri
Blue jay, Cyanocitta cristata (NC)
Clark's nutcracker, Nucifraga columbiana
Black-billed magpie, Pica hudsonia
American crow, Corvus brachyrhynchos
Common raven, Corvus corax

Tits, chickadees, and titmice
Order: PasseriformesFamily: Paridae

The Paridae are mainly small stocky woodland species with short stout bills. Some have crests. They are adaptable birds, with a mixed diet including seeds and insects.

Black-capped chickadee, Poecile atricapilla
Mountain chickadee, Poecile gambeli

Larks
Order: PasseriformesFamily: Alaudidae

Larks are small terrestrial birds with often extravagant songs and display flights. Most larks are fairly dull in appearance. Their food is insects and seeds

Horned lark, Eremophila alpestris

Swallows
Order: PasseriformesFamily: Hirundinidae

The family Hirundinidae is adapted to aerial feeding. They have a slender streamlined body, long pointed wings, and a short bill with a wide gape. The feet are adapted to perching rather than walking, and the front toes are partially joined at the base.

Bank swallow, Riparia riparia
Tree swallow, Tachycineta bicolor
Violet-green swallow, Tachycineta thalassina
Northern rough-winged swallow, Stelgidopteryx serripennis
Barn swallow, Hirundo rustica
Cliff swallow, Petrochelidon pyrrhonota

Kinglets
Order: PasseriformesFamily: Regulidae

The kinglets are a small family of birds which resemble the titmice. They are very small insectivorous birds, mostly in the genus Regulus. The adults have colored crowns, giving rise to their names.

Ruby-crowned kinglet, Corthylio calendula
Golden-crowned kinglet, Regulus satrapa (U)

Waxwings
Order: PasseriformesFamily: Bombycillidae

The waxwings are a group of passerine birds with soft silky plumage and unique red tips to some of the wing feathers. In the Bohemian and cedar waxwings, these tips look like sealing wax and give the group its name. These are arboreal birds of northern forests. They live on insects in summer and berries in winter.

Bohemian waxwing, Bombycilla garrulus (NC)
Cedar waxwing, Bombycilla cedrorum

Nuthatches
Order: PasseriformesFamily: Sittidae

Nuthatches are small woodland birds. They have the unusual ability to climb down trees head first, unlike other birds which can only go upwards. Nuthatches have big heads, short tails, and powerful bills and feet.

Red-breasted nuthatch, Sitta canadensis
White-breasted nuthatch, Sitta carolinensis (U)
Pygmy nuthatch, Sitta pygmaea (O)

Treecreepers
Order: PasseriformesFamily: Certhiidae

Treecreepers are small woodland birds, brown above and white below. They have thin pointed down-curved bills, which they use to extricate insects from bark. They have stiff tail feathers, like woodpeckers, which they use to support themselves on vertical trees.

Brown creeper, Certhia americana

Gnatcatchers
Order: PasseriformesFamily: Polioptilidae

These dainty birds resemble Old World warblers in their structure and habits, moving restlessly through the foliage seeking insects. The gnatcatchers are mainly soft bluish gray in color and have the typical insectivore's long sharp bill. Many species have distinctive black head patterns (especially males) and long, regularly cocked, black-and-white tails.

Blue-gray gnatcatcher, Polioptila caerulea (NC)

Wrens
Order: PasseriformesFamily: Troglodytidae

Wrens are small and inconspicuous birds, except for their loud songs. They have short wings and thin down-turned bills. Several species often hold their tails upright. All are insectivorous.

Rock wren, Salpinctes obsoletus
Canyon wren, Catherpes mexicanus (NC)
House wren, Troglodytes aedon
Winter wren, Troglodytes hiemalis (NC)
Marsh wren, Cistothorus palustris

Mockingbirds and thrashers
Order: PasseriformesFamily: Mimidae

The mimids are a family of passerine birds which includes thrashers, mockingbirds, tremblers, and the New World catbirds. These birds are notable for their vocalization, especially their remarkable ability to mimic a wide variety of birds and other sounds heard outdoors. The species tend towards dull grays and browns in their appearance.

Gray catbird, Dumetella carolinensis (U)
Brown thrasher, Toxostoma rufum (NC)
Sage thrasher, Oreoscoptes montanus (U)

Starlings
Order: PasseriformesFamily: Sturnidae

Starlings are small to medium-sized passerine birds. They are medium-sized passerines with strong feet. Their flight is strong and direct and they are very gregarious. Their preferred habitat is fairly open country, and they eat insects and fruit. Plumage is typically dark with a metallic sheen.

European starling, Sturnus vulgaris (I) (U)

Dippers
Order: PasseriformesFamily: Cinclidae

Dippers are small, stout, birds that feed in cold, fast moving streams.

American dipper, Cinclus mexicanus

Thrushes and allies
Order: PasseriformesFamily: Turdidae

The thrushes are a group of passerine birds that occur mainly but not exclusively in the Old World. They are plump, soft plumaged, small to medium-sized insectivores or sometimes omnivores, often feeding on the ground. Many have attractive songs.

Western bluebird, Sialia mexicana (NC)
Mountain bluebird, Sialia currucoides
Townsend's solitaire, Myadestes townsendi
Veery, Catharus fuscescens (NC)
Swainson's thrush, Catharus ustulatus
Hermit thrush, Catharus guttatus
American robin, Turdus migratorius
Varied thrush, Ixoreus naevius (R)

Wagtails and pipits
Order: PasseriformesFamily: Motacillidae

Motacillidae is a family of small passerine birds with medium to long tails. They include the wagtails, longclaws, and pipits. They are slender ground-feeding insectivores of open country.

American pipit, Anthus rubescens (U)
Sprague's pipit, Anthus spragueii (NC)

Finches, euphonias, and allies
Order: PasseriformesFamily: Fringillidae

Finches are seed-eating passerine birds, that are small to moderately large and have a strong beak, usually conical and in some species very large. All have twelve tail feathers and nine primaries. These birds have a bouncing flight with alternating bouts of flapping and gliding on closed wings, and most sing well.

Evening grosbeak, Coccothraustes vespertinus
Pine grosbeak, Pinicola enucleator (U)
Gray-crowned rosy-finch, Leucosticte tephrocotis (U)
Black rosy-finch, Leucosticte atrata
House finch, Haemorhous mexicanus
Cassin's finch, Haemorhous cassinii
Common redpoll, Acanthis flammea (NC)
Hoary redpoll, Acanthis hornemanni (NC)
Red crossbill, Loxia curvirostra
White-winged crossbill, Loxia leucoptera (R)
Pine siskin, Spinus pinus
American goldfinch, Spinus tristis

Longspurs and snow buntings
Order: PasseriformesFamily: Calcariidae

The Calcariidae are a group of passerine birds that were traditionally grouped with the New World sparrows, but differ in a number of respects and are usually found in open grassy areas.

Lapland longspur, Calcarius lapponicus (NC)
Snow bunting, Plectrophenax nivalis (U)

New World sparrows
Order: PasseriformesFamily: Passerellidae

Until 2017, these species were considered part of the family Emberizidae. Most of the species are known as sparrows, but these birds are not closely related to the Old World sparrows which are in the family Passeridae. Many of these have distinctive head patterns.

Black-throated sparrow, Amphispiza bilineata (NC)
Lark sparrow, Chondestes grammacus (NC)
Lark bunting, Calamospiza melanocorys (NC)
Chipping sparrow, Spizella passerina
Brewer's sparrow, Spizella breweri
Fox sparrow, Passerella iliaca
American tree sparrow, Spizelloides arborea (NC)
Dark-eyed junco, Junco hyemalis
White-crowned sparrow, Zonotrichia leucophrys
Golden-crowned sparrow, Zonotrichia atricapilla (NC)
Harris's sparrow, Zonotrichia querula (NC)
White-throated sparrow, Zonotrichia albicollis (NC)
Sagebrush sparrow, Artemisiospiza nevadensis (NC)
Vesper sparrow, Pooecetes gramineus
Savannah sparrow, Passerculus sandwichensis
Song sparrow, Melospiza melodia
Lincoln's sparrow, Melospiza lincolnii
Swamp sparrow, Melospiza georgiana (NC)
Green-tailed towhee, Pipilo chlorurus
Eastern towhee, Pipilo erythrophthalmus (NC)

Yellow-breasted chat
Order: PasseriformesFamily: Icteriidae

This species was historically placed in the wood-warblers (Parulidae) but nonetheless most authorities were unsure if it belonged there. It was placed in its own family in 2017.

Yellow-breasted chat, Icteria virens  (NC)

Troupials and allies
Order: PasseriformesFamily: Icteridae

The icterids are a group of small to medium-sized, often colorful passerine birds restricted to the New World and include the grackles, New World blackbirds, and New World orioles. Most species have black as a predominant plumage color, often enlivened by yellow, orange, or red.

Yellow-headed blackbird, Xanthocephalus xanthocephalus
Bobolink, Dolichonyx oryzivorus (U)
Western meadowlark, Sturnella neglecta
Bullock's oriole, Icterus bullockii (NC)
Baltimore oriole, Icterus galbula (NC)
Red-winged blackbird, Agelaius phoeniceus
Brown-headed cowbird, Molothrus ater
Brewer's blackbird, Euphagus cyanocephalus
Common grackle, Quiscalus quiscula (U)

New World warblers
Order: PasseriformesFamily: Parulidae

The wood-warblers are a group of small often colorful passerine birds restricted to the New World. Most are arboreal, but some like the ovenbird and the two waterthrushes, are more terrestrial. Most members of this family are insectivores.

Northern waterthrush, Parkesia noveboracensis (R)
Black-and-white warbler, Mniotilta varia (NC)
Tennessee warbler, Leiothlypis peregrina (NC)
Orange-crowned warbler, Leiothlypis celata (U)
Nashville warbler, Leiothlypis ruficapilla (NC)
MacGillivray's warbler, Geothlypis tolmiei
Common yellowthroat, Geothlypis trichas
American redstart, Setophaga ruticilla (NC)
Blackburnian warbler, Setophaga fusca (NC)
Yellow warbler, Setophaga petechia
Chestnut-sided warbler, Setophaga pensylvanica (NC)
Black-throated blue warbler, Setophaga caerulescens (NC)
Yellow-rumped warbler, Setophaga coronata
Black-throated gray warbler, Setophaga nigrescens (NC)
Townsend's warbler, Setophaga townsendi (R)
Wilson's warbler, Cardellina pusilla

Cardinals and allies
Order: PasseriformesFamily: Cardinalidae

The cardinals are a family of robust, seed-eating birds with strong bills. They are typically associated with open woodland. The sexes usually have distinct plumages.

Western tanager, Piranga ludoviciana
Rose-breasted grosbeak, Pheucticus ludovicianus (NC)
Black-headed grosbeak, Pheucticus melanocephalus
Lazuli bunting, Passerina amoena

See also
List of birds of Wyoming
List of birds
Lists of birds by region
List of birds of North America

References

External links
Wyoming Audubon Society..

Wyoming, Grand Teton
Birds
Grand Teton National Park